Chanute USD 413 is a public unified school district headquartered in Chanute, United States.  The district includes the communities of Chanute, Earlton, Petrolia, and nearby rural areas.

Schools
The school district operates the following schools:
 Chanute High School (9-12)
 Royster Middle School (6-8)
 Chanute Elementary School (K-5) - opened in 2009 to consolidate four elementary schools
 Lincoln Early Learning Center (PreK)

Closed schools
 Alcott Elementary School (closed in 2009)
 Hutton Elementary School (closed in 2009)
 Murray Hill Elementary School (closed in 2009)

See also
 Kansas State Department of Education
 Kansas State High School Activities Association
 List of high schools in Kansas
 List of unified school districts in Kansas

References

External links
 
 Chanute students treated to new facilities - Chanute Tribune - May 2, 2009

School districts in Kansas